The EGA Trophy was an annual amateur boys' under-21 team golf competition between Great Britain & Ireland and the Continent of Europe.

History
The match was instituted in 1967 and played every year until it was discontinued in 1994. The first time the Continental team won was when it was held in Sweden in 1980. Initially the event was held on the day before the start of the British Youths Open Championship. There were 5 foursomes matches in the morning and 10 singles in the afternoon. After 1985, the venue generally alternated between Great Britain and the continent.

Format
The teams tournament was played over two days, with foursomes in the morning and singles matches in the afternoon. The Great Britain and Ireland team was selected by The Royal and Ancient Golf Club and the Continent of Europe side by the European Golf Association.

Results
The Great Britain & Ireland team won the event 25 times, while Continental Europe has 3 victories. The 1984 match ended in a tie, so Great Britain & Ireland retained the trophy. The 1981 match was shortened due to adverse weather conditions.

Teams

Great Britain & Ireland
1967 Peter Benka, Allan Brodie, Andrew Brooks, John Cook, Bob Durrant, Alan Holmes, Bill Lockie, Peter Oosterhuis, Tony Thornley, John Threlfall, Steve Warrin
1968 Peter Benka, Andrew Brooks, Bill Davidson, Bob Durrant, Peter Hedges, Sandy Horne, Bill Lockie, Peter Oosterhuis, Peter Tupling, Martin Walters
1969 John Cook, Peter Dawson, John Davies, Bob Durrant, Andrew Forrester, Warren Humphreys, Bill Lockie, Doug McClelland, George McKay
1970 Peter Berry, Bobby Blackwood, Roddy Carr, Jim Farmer, Warren Humphreys, Michael King, John McTear, John O'Leary, Steve Rolley, Alistair Thomson
1971 Peter Berry, Roddy Carr, David Chillas, Simon Cox, Mark Gannon, Barclay Howard, Warren Humphreys, Michael King, Ian Mosey, Ian Ritchie
1972 Peter Berry, Clive Brown, Simon Cox, Pip Elson, Barclay Howard, Carl Mason, Willie Milne, Ian Mosey, Roger Revell, Sandy Stephen
1973 Andrew Chandler, Howard Clark, Simon Cox, Martin Foster, Barclay Howard, Garry Logan, Carl Mason, John Putt, David Robertson, Sandy Stephen
1974 Nigel Burch, Andrew Chandler, John Downie, Richard Eyles, Garry Harvey, Barclay Howard, Mark James, Martin Poxon, David Robertson, Sandy Stephen
1975 Nigel Burch, Nick Faldo, Garry Harvey, Mark James, Sandy Lyle, Steve Martin, Peter Deeble, Martin Poxon, Sandy Stephen, Peter Wilson
1976 Gordon J. Brand, Paul Downes, Malcolm Lewis, Sandy Lyle, Brian Marchbank, Steve Martin, Paul McKellar, Chris Mitchell, Martin Poxon, Hogan Stott, Peter Wilson
1977 John Cuddihy, Paul Downes, Malcolm Lewis, Sandy Lyle, Brian Marchbank, Steve Martin, Paul McKellar, Hogan Stott, Grant Turner, Alastair Webster
1978 Gordon Brand Jnr, Paul Carrigill, John Cuddihy, Paul Downes, Hugh Evans, Paul Hoad, Brian Marchbank, Alistair Taylor, Keith Waters, Alastair Webster
1979 Gordon Brand Jnr, Roger Chapman, Paul Downes, Haydn Green, Garry Hay, Paul Hoad, Brian Marchbank, Jonathan Morrow, Stuart Taylor, David Williams
1980 Roger Chapman, Paul Downes, Duncan Evans, Garry Hay, Jonathan Morrow, Ronan Rafferty, Stuart Taylor, Philip Walton (selected team)
1981 George Barrie, David Blakeman, Richard Boxall, Frank Coutts, Paul Downes, John Huggan, Jonathan Morrow, Ian Young
1982 Colin Dalgleish, Campbell Elliott, Stephen Keppler, Lindsay Mann, Philip Parkin, David Ray, Martin Thompson, David Wood
1983 Neil Anderson, David Gilford, Craig Laurence, Lindsay Mann, Paul Mayo, Stephen McAllister, Maurice Moir, Roger Roper, Ernie Wilson
1984 Colin Brooks, Mark Davis, David Gilford, Craig Laurence, Paul Mayo, Maurice Moir, Colin Montgomerie, Neil Roderick
1985 Steven Bottomley, Colin Brooks, Stephen Easingwood, Freddie George, Emyr Jones, Eoghan O'Connell, Kenny Walker, Roger Winchester
1986 Paul Girvan, Richard Muscroft, Phillip Price, Steven Richardson, Alex Robertson, Jeremy Robinson, Neil Roderick, Bryan Shields, Kenny Walker
1987 Jim Fleming, Andrew Hare, Bradley Knight, Gary Orr, Phillip Price, Alan Tait, Alasdair Watt, Roger Winchester
1988 Stuart Bannerman, Darren Clarke, Andrew Coltart, James Cook, Craig Everett, Ken Kearney, James Lee, Darren Prosser, Alan Tait
1989 Andrew Coltart, Andrew Elliot, David Errity, Gary Evans, Keith Jones, James Lee, Euan McIntosh, Jim Payne, Mike Smith
1990 David Bathgate, Andrew Coltart, Ian Garbutt, Pádraig Harrington, Richard Johnson, Andrew Jones, Simon Mackenzie, Gary McNeill, Jim Payne
1991 Andrew Barnett, Ian Garbutt, Pádraig Harrington, Martin Hastie, Garry Houston, Raife Hutt, Andrew Jones, Nick Ludwell, Dean Robertson
1992 Warren Bennett, Raymond Burns, Richie Coughlan, Richard Dinsdale, Bradley Dredge, Ian Garbutt, Pádraig Harrington, Mark Pullan, Raymond Russell
1993 Raymond Burns, Stuart Cage, Bradley Dredge, Richard Johnson, Gary Murphy, Van Phillips, Iain Pyman, Alan Reid, Raymond Russell
1994 Richard Bland, Richie Coughlan, David Downie, Bradley Dredge, Scott Drummond, Stephen Gallacher, Lee S. James, Keith Nolan, Gordon Sherry

Continental Europe
This list is incomplete
1984 Alberto Binaghi, Thomas Dekorsy, Marco Durante, Emmanuel Dussart, Ignacio Gervás, Enrico Nistri, José María Olazábal, Sergio Prati
1985 Alberto Binaghi, H Erickson, Ignacio Gervás, Adam Mednick, Olle Nordberg, José María Olazábal, Ekkehart Schieffer, Jean van de Velde
1986 Stephen Lindskog, Yago Beamonte, H Erikson, Laurent Lasalle, F Ortiz, Ángel Sartorius, Sven Strüver, Jean van de Velde, Ulrich Zilg
1987 Jesús María Arruti, Patrice Barquez, Eric Giraud, Per-Ulrik Johansson, Thomas Levet, Olle Nordberg, Antonio Reale, Sven Strüver
1988 Jesús María Arruti, José Manuel Arruti, Patrice Barquez, Eric Giraud, Jakob Greisen, Joakim Haeggman, Thomas Levet, Paolo Quirici, Constant Smits van Waesberghe
1989 José Manuel Arruti, Patrice Barquez, Christian Cévaër, Massimo Florioli, Eric Giraud, Jakob Greisen, Robert Karlsson, Jan-Erik Schapmann
1990 Carlos Beautell, Diego Borrego, Emanuele Canonica, Christian Cévaër, Olivier Edmond, Massimo Florioli, Jakob Greisen, Christophe Pottier, Jan-Erik Schapmann
1991 Carlos Beautell, Dimitri Bieri, Diego Borrego, Frédéric Cupillard, Klas Eriksson, Massimo Florioli, Marco Gortana, Pehr Magnebrant, Massimo Scarpa
1992 Fredrik Andersson, Max Anglert, Thomas Bjørn, Diego Borrego, Frédéric Cupillard, Niclas Fasth, Ignacio Garrido, Tomas Jesus Muñoz, Kalle Väinölä
1993 Carlos Beautell, Jan Dahlström, Jean-Yann Dusson, Freddie Jacobson, Mikael Lundberg, Rudi Sailer, Fabrice Stolear, Francisco Valera, Nicolas Vanhootegem
1994 Kalle Brink, Eric Carlberg, Francisco Cea, Diego Dupin, Viktor Gustavsson, Morten Hagen, Mika Lehtinen, Mikael Lundberg, Niki Zitny

See also
St Andrews Trophy - the equivalent men's event
Jacques Léglise Trophy - the equivalent boys under-18 event

References

External links
 Coverage on the EGA's site

Junior golf tournaments
Team golf tournaments
European international sports competitions
R&A championships
Recurring sporting events established in 1967
Recurring sporting events disestablished in 1994